Bob and Tom Radio: The Comedy Tour is a DVD made as a spin-off from the American syndicated radio program The Bob & Tom Show.

The daily show is hosted by Bob Kevoian and Tom Griswold and its format is that of a comedy variety show.  There are usually several guests on the show, including comedians seeking a national fan base.

Over the past few years, Kevoian and Griswold have organized comedy show tours around the USA, with select groups of 4-5 comedians and one of their stalwart show members, such as Kristi Lee or Chick McGee, as an emcee. These are now known collectively as the Bob and Tom Radio Comedy Tours, and they play in venues all over the country.  The high penetration of their 150-station syndication almost guarantees a full house of folks who are very much in tune with the comedians through their radio presence on the Bob and Tom Show.

As a way to extend their popular format into the homes of viewers, they have filmed the performances of more than a dozen exceptional standup comedians at the historic Paramount Theatre in Anderson, Indiana.

A "cleaner" and shortened version of the DVD was presented on Comedy Central shortly before the DVD went on full release to the public.

Volume 1 comedians
 Greg Hahn
 Mike Armstrong
 Roy Wood Jr.
 Drew Hastings
 Bob Zany

References

2006 comedy films
Comedy tours
Stand-up comedy on DVD
2010s English-language films